Salvatore D'Ancora (born 6 May 1995) is an Italian football player who plays for Brindisi FC.

Club career
He made his Serie B debut for Juve Stabia on 3 May 2014 in a game against Latina.

References

External links
 
 Salvatore D'Ancora at Tuttocalciatori

1995 births
People from Salerno
Sportspeople from the Province of Salerno
Living people
Italian footballers
S.S. Juve Stabia players
Cavese 1919 players
A.S. Bisceglie Calcio 1913 players
Serie B players
Serie C players
Serie D players
Association football midfielders
Footballers from Campania
21st-century Italian people